The Card is a 1922 British comedy film directed by A. V. Bramble and starring Laddie Cliff, Hilda Cowley and Joan Barry. It is an adaptation of the 1911 novel The Card by Arnold Bennett.

Cast
 Laddie Cliff - Denry Machin
 Hilda Cowley - Ruth Earp
 Joan Barry - Nellie Cotterill
 Mary Dibley - Countess of Chell
 Sidney Paxton - Councillor Cotterill
 Dora Gregory - Mrs Machin
 Norman Page - Mr Duncalf
 Arthur Cleave - Mr Shillitoe
 Jack Denton - Barlow
 Frank Goddard - Boxer

References

Bibliography
 Monk, Claire & Sergeant, Amy. British historical cinema: the history, heritage and costume film. Routledge, 2002.

External links

1922 films
1922 comedy films
Films directed by A. V. Bramble
Ideal Film Company films
Films based on works by Arnold Bennett
British comedy films
British black-and-white films
British silent feature films
1920s English-language films
1920s British films
Silent comedy films